Koryun Soghomonyan (born 16 May 1993) is an Armenian boxer. He competed in the men's flyweight event at the 2020 Summer Olympics, as well as two editions of the World Championships in 2013 and 2015.

References

External links
 

1993 births
Living people
Armenian male boxers
Olympic boxers of Armenia
Boxers at the 2020 Summer Olympics
People from Kotayk Province
Flyweight boxers
Light-flyweight boxers
21st-century Armenian people